This is a list of notable software packages which were published as free and open-source software, or into the public domain, but were made proprietary software, or otherwise switched to a license (including source-available licenses) that is not considered to be free and open source.

See also
List of formerly proprietary software

References 

Formerly open-source software
Open-source software converted to a proprietary license